Đuro Gašpar (22 April 1900 – 21 October 1981) was a Croatian athlete. He competed in the men's decathlon at the 1924 Summer Olympics, representing Yugoslavia.

References

External links
 

1900 births
1981 deaths
Athletes (track and field) at the 1924 Summer Olympics
Croatian decathletes
Olympic athletes of Yugoslavia
Sportspeople from Zagreb
Olympic decathletes
20th-century Croatian people